Mirco Sadotti (born 18 May 1975 in Arezzo) is a retired Italian professional footballer who played as a defender.

He played two games in the Serie A in the 1999–2000 season for Italian club U.S. Lecce. At international level, he also represented the Italy national under-21 football team.

References

External links
 

1975 births
Living people
Italian footballers
Italy under-21 international footballers
Italy youth international footballers
Serie A players
Serie B players
A.C. Cesena players
Venezia F.C. players
U.S. Salernitana 1919 players
A.C. Monza players
U.S. Lecce players
Delfino Pescara 1936 players
Calcio Padova players
A.C. Reggiana 1919 players
S.P.A.L. players
Montevarchi Calcio Aquila 1902 players
Sportspeople from Arezzo
Association football defenders
Footballers from Tuscany